Newgate was one of the historic seven gates of the London Wall around the City of London. Newgate may also refer to:
 Newgate, Chester, an arch bridge in Chester
 Newgate (company), a British designer and manufacturer of clocks and watches
 Newgate Education Center, a school in Minneapolis, Minnesota
 Newgate Mall, a shopping mall in Ogden, Utah
 Newgate novel, a novel about criminals published in England from the 1820s until the 1840s
 Newgate (York), a street in York

See also
 New Gate, a gate in the Old City of Jerusalem
 Newgate Prison (disambiguation)
 Newgate Street (disambiguation)